Penrhiwnewydd is a hamlet in the community of Trefeurig, Ceredigion, Wales, which is 74.1 miles (119.2 km) from Cardiff and 175.3 miles (282 km) from London. Penrhiwnewydd is represented in the Senedd by Elin Jones (Plaid Cymru) and is part of the Ceredigion constituency in the House of Commons.

References

See also 
 List of localities in Wales by population 

Villages in Ceredigion